Buford is the name of a number of places in the State of Texas in the United States of America:

Buford, El Paso County, Texas
Buford, Mitchell County, Texas